Falmouth Boslowick is an electoral division of Cornwall in the United Kingdom and returns one member to sit on Cornwall Council. The current Councillor is Alan Jewell, a Conservative. The current division is distinct from those of the same name used from 2009 to 2013 and from 2013 to 2021, after boundary changes at the 2013 and 2021 local elections.

Councillors

2013-2021

2021-present

2021-present division

Extent
The current division represents the south west of the town of Falmouth, including Boslowick, Swanvale and Maenporth Beach. The hamlet of Mongleath is shared with the Falmouth Trescobeas and Budock division.

Election results

2021 election

2009-2021 divisions

Extent
Falmouth Boslowick represented part of the town of Falmouth, including Boslowick and Maenporth. The division was nominally abolished during boundary changes at the 2013 election, but this had little effect on the ward. Both before and after boundary changes, the ward covered 283 hectares in total.

Election results

2017 election

2013 election

2009 election

Notes

References

Electoral divisions of Cornwall Council
Falmouth, Cornwall